Tino Sunseri (born December 21, 1988) is an American football coach and former quarterback who is currently a quarterbacks coach at the James Madison University. He was originally signed by the Saskatchewan Roughriders in 2013. He played college football at Pittsburgh.

College career
Tino Sunseri was the starting quarterback at the University of Pittsburgh for 3 years. A local Central Catholic grad, Tino led Pitt to a 20-19 record including three bowl appearances. He went undrafted in the 2013 NFL Draft at the end of his senior year.

Professional career
Sunseri shares the all-time professional football (NFL and CFL) record for the most two-point converts scored in a single game, at three, for six points in total, with Philadelphia Eagles quarterback Carson Wentz , who converted three conversions in the November 19, 2017, contest against the Dallas Cowboys. This is one short of the all-time team record of four scored by the St. Louis Rams during their game with the Atlanta Falcons on October 15, 2000. All conversions by Sunseri were done consecutively (via passing), in a 31-24 loss to the Calgary Stampeders on October 3, 2014. The three two-point conversions in a single game by one team is an all-time CFL record.

On June 15, 2015, Sunseri was among the Roughriders first cuts, and was released to free agency. On July 1, 2015, it was announced that he was re-signed to the Saskatchewan Roughriders due to a season-ending injury to the Roughriders' starting quarterback Darian Durant. General Manager Brendan Taman stated Tino's knowledge of Jacques Chapdelaine's offensive system was the key to his signing.
On September 1, 2015, Sunseri was once again cut by the Roughriders. His cut was among the firing of the Roughriders head coach and general manager, after an 0-9 start to the 2015 season.

Personal life
His father, Sal Sunseri, is a defensive coach for the Alabama Crimson Tide and his younger brother, Vinnie Sunseri, who played defensive back at Alabama, was a 5th-round draft pick by the New Orleans Saints in the 2014 NFL Draft and also played for the San Francisco 49ers.

References

External links
Saskatchewan Roughriders bio
Pittsburgh Panthers bio

1988 births
Living people
Coaches of American football from Pennsylvania
Players of American football from Pittsburgh
Players of Canadian football from Pittsburgh
American football quarterbacks
Canadian football quarterbacks
American players of Canadian football
Pittsburgh Panthers football players
Saskatchewan Roughriders players
Sportspeople from Pittsburgh
Florida State Seminoles football coaches 
Tennessee Volunteers football coaches
Alabama Crimson Tide football coaches